Carmelo Yuste Yuste (born 3 February 1984) is a Spanish former footballer who played as a midfielder.

Club career
Born in Teruel, Aragon, Yuste totalled 47 Segunda División games over two seasons with SD Eibar. He also played professionally in Cyprus.

Yuste's first appearance in the second tier took place on 25 August 2007, when he featured the full 90 minutes of a 1–1 away draw against Racing de Ferrol. The following season ended in relegation.

References

External links

1984 births
Living people
People from Teruel
Sportspeople from the Province of Teruel
Spanish footballers
Footballers from Aragon
Association football midfielders
Segunda División players
Segunda División B players
Tercera División players
CD Universidad de Zaragoza players
Real Zaragoza B players
SD Eibar footballers
AD Alcorcón footballers
CF Palencia footballers
AD Ceuta FC players
CD Boiro footballers
CD Teruel footballers
Cypriot First Division players
APOP Kinyras FC players
Spanish expatriate footballers
Expatriate footballers in Cyprus
Spanish expatriate sportspeople in Cyprus